Policing and Society is a quarterly peer-reviewed academic journal covering the study of policing. It was established in 2002 and is published by Taylor & Francis. According to the Journal Citation Reports, the journal has a 2015 impact factor of 1.610, ranking it 15th out of 57 journals in the category "Criminology & Penology".

References

External links

Policing journals
Publications established in 2002
Quarterly journals
Taylor & Francis academic journals
English-language journals
Sociology journals